"We Shall Overcome" is a gospel song which became a protest song and a key anthem of the American civil rights movement. The song is most commonly attributed as being lyrically descended from "I'll Overcome Some Day", a hymn by Charles Albert Tindley that was first published in 1901.

The modern version of the song was first said to have been sung by tobacco workers led by Lucille Simmons during the 1945–1946 Charleston Cigar Factory strike in Charleston, South Carolina. In 1947, the song was published under the title "We Will Overcome" in an edition of the People's Songs Bulletin (a publication of People's Songs, an organization of which Pete Seeger was the director), as a contribution of and with an introduction by Zilphia Horton, then-music director of the Highlander Folk School of Monteagle, Tennessee (an adult education school that trained union organizers). Horton said she had learned the song from Simmons, and she considered it to be her favorite song. According to Horton, "one of the stanzas of the original hymn was 'we will overcome'. ... It sort of stops them cold silent.'" 

She taught it to many others, including Pete Seeger, who included it in his repertoire, as did many other activist singers, such as Frank Hamilton and Joe Glazer, who recorded it in 1950.

The song became associated with the civil rights movement from 1959, when Guy Carawan stepped in with his and Seeger's version as song leader at Highlander, which was then focused on nonviolent civil rights activism. It quickly became the movement's unofficial anthem. Seeger and other famous folksingers in the early 1960s, such as Joan Baez, sang the song at rallies, folk festivals, and concerts in the North and helped make it widely known. Since its rise to prominence, the song, and songs based on it, have been used in a variety of protests worldwide.

The U.S. copyright of the People's Songs Bulletin issue which contained "We Will Overcome" expired in 1976, but The Richmond Organization asserted a copyright on the "We Shall Overcome" lyrics, registered in 1960. In 2017, in response to a lawsuit against TRO over allegations of false copyright claims, a U.S. judge issued an opinion that the registered work was insufficiently different from the "We Will Overcome" lyrics that had fallen into the public domain because of non-renewal. In January 2018, the company agreed to a settlement under which it would no longer assert any copyright claims over the song.

Origins as gospel, folk, and labor song
"I'll Overcome Some Day" was a hymn or gospel music composition by the Reverend Charles Albert Tindley of Philadelphia that was first published in 1901. A noted minister of the Methodist Episcopal Church, Tindley was the author of approximately 50 gospel hymns, of which "We'll Understand It By and By" and "Stand By Me" are among the best known. The published text bore the epigraph, "Ye shall overcome if ye faint not", derived from Galatians 6:9: "And let us not be weary in doing good, for in due season we shall reap, if we faint not." The first stanza began:

Tindley's songs were written in an idiom rooted in African American folk traditions, using pentatonic intervals, with ample space allowed for improvised interpolation, the addition of "blue" thirds and sevenths, and frequently featuring short refrains in which the congregation could join. Tindley's importance, however, was primarily as a lyricist and poet whose words spoke directly to the feelings of his audiences, many of whom had been freed from slavery only 36 years before he first published his songs, and were often impoverished, illiterate, and newly arrived in the North. "Even today," wrote musicologist Horace Boyer in 1983, "ministers quote his texts in the midst of their sermons as if they were poems, as indeed they are."

A letter printed on the front page of February 1909, United Mine Workers Journal states: "Last year at a strike, we opened every meeting with a prayer, and singing that good old song, 'We Will Overcome'." This statement implied that the song was well-known, and it was also the first acknowledgment of such a song having been sung in both a secular context and a mixed-race setting.

Tindley's "I'll Overcome Some Day" was believed to have influenced the structure for "We Shall Overcome", with both the text and the melody having undergone a process of alteration. The tune has been changed so that it now echoes the opening and closing melody of "No More Auction Block For Me", also known from its refrain as "Many Thousands Gone". This was number 35 in Thomas Wentworth Higginson's collection of Negro Spirituals that appeared in the Atlantic Monthly of  June 1867, with a comment by Higginson reflecting on how such songs were composed (i.e., whether the work of a single author or through what used to be called "communal composition"):

Coincidentally, Bob Dylan claims that he used the very same melodic motif from "No More Auction Block" for his composition, "Blowin' in the Wind". Thus similarities of melodic and rhythmic patterns imparted cultural and emotional resonance ("the same feeling") towards three different, and historically very significant songs.

Music scholars have also pointed out that the first half of "We Shall Overcome" bears a notable resemblance to the famous lay Catholic hymn "O Sanctissima", also known as "The Sicilian Mariners Hymn", first published by a London magazine in 1792 and then by an American magazine in 1794 and widely circulated in American hymnals. The second half of "We Shall Overcome" is essentially the same music as the 19th-century hymn "I'll Be All Right". As Victor Bobetsky summarized in his 2015 book on the subject: "'We Shall Overcome' owes its existence to many ancestors and to the constant change and adaptation that is typical of the folk music process."

Role of the Highlander Folk School
In October 1945 in Charleston, South Carolina, members of the Food, Tobacco, Agricultural, and Allied Workers union (FTA-CIO), who were mostly female and African American, began a five-month strike against the American Tobacco Company. To keep up their spirits during the cold, wet winter of 1945–1946, one of the strikers, a woman named Lucille Simmons, led a slow "long meter style" version of the gospel hymn, "We'll Overcome (I'll Be All Right)" to end each day's picketing. Union organizer Zilphia Horton, who was the wife of the co-founder of the Highlander Folk School (later Highlander Research and Education Center), said she learned it from Simmons. Horton was Highlander's music director during 1935–1956, and it became her custom to end group meetings each evening by leading this, her favorite song. During the presidential campaign of Henry A. Wallace, "We Will Overcome" was printed in Bulletin No. 3 (September 1948), 8, of People's Songs, with an introduction by Horton saying that she had learned it from the interracial FTA-CIO workers and had found it to be extremely powerful. Pete Seeger, a founding member of People's Songs and its director for three years, learned it from Horton's version in 1947. Seeger writes: "I changed it to 'We shall'... I think I liked a more open sound; 'We will' has alliteration to it, but 'We shall' opens the mouth wider; the 'i' in 'will' is not an easy vowel to sing well ...." Seeger also added some verses ("We'll walk hand in hand" and "The whole wide world around").

In 1950, the CIO's Department of Education and Research released the album, Eight New Songs for Labor, sung by Joe Glazer ("Labor's Troubador"), and the Elm City Four. (Songs on the album were: "I Ain't No Stranger Now", "Too Old to Work", "That's All", "Humblin' Back", "Shine on Me",  "Great Day", "The Mill Was Made of Marble", and "We Will Overcome".) During a Southern CIO drive, Glazer taught the song to country singer Texas Bill Strength, who cut a version that was later picked up by 4-Star Records.

The song made its first recorded appearance as "We Shall Overcome" (rather than "We Will Overcome") in 1952 on a disc recorded by Laura Duncan (soloist) and The Jewish Young Singers (chorus), conducted by Robert De Cormier, co-produced by Ernie Lieberman and Irwin Silber on Hootenany Records (Hoot 104-A) (Folkways, FN 2513, BCD15720), where it is identified as a Negro Spiritual.

Frank Hamilton, a folk singer from California who was a member of People's Songs and later The Weavers, picked up Seeger's version. Hamilton's friend and traveling companion, fellow-Californian Guy Carawan, learned the song from Hamilton. Carawan and Hamilton, accompanied by Ramblin Jack Elliot, visited Highlander in the early 1950s where they also would have heard Zilphia Horton sing the song. In 1957, Seeger sang for a Highlander audience that included Dr. Martin Luther King Jr., who remarked on the way to his next stop, in Kentucky, about how much the song had stuck with him. When, in 1959, Guy Carawan succeeded Horton as music director at Highlander, he reintroduced it at the school. It was the young (many of them teenagers) student-activists at Highlander, however, who gave the song the words and rhythms for which it is currently known, when they sang it to keep their spirits up during the frightening police raids on Highlander and their subsequent stays in jail in 1959–1960. Because of this, Carawan has been reluctant to claim credit for the song's widespread popularity. In the PBS video We Shall Overcome, Julian Bond credits Carawan with teaching and singing the song at the founding meeting of the Student Nonviolent Coordinating Committee in Raleigh, North Carolina, in 1960. From there, it spread orally and became an anthem of Southern African American labor union and civil rights activism. Seeger has also publicly, in concert, credited Carawan with the primary role of teaching and popularizing the song within the civil rights movement.

Use in the 1960s civil rights and other protest movements
In August 1963, 22-year old folksinger Joan Baez, led a crowd of 300,000 in singing "We Shall Overcome" at the Lincoln Memorial during A. Philip Randolph's March on Washington. President Lyndon Johnson, himself a Southerner, used the phrase "we shall overcome" in addressing Congress on March 15, 1965, in a speech delivered after the violent "Bloody Sunday" attacks on civil rights demonstrators during the Selma to Montgomery marches, thus legitimizing the protest movement.

Four days before the April 4, 1968 assassination of Martin Luther King Jr., King recited the words from "We Shall Overcome" in his final sermon, delivered in Memphis on Sunday, March 31. He had done so in a similar sermon delivered in 1965 before an interfaith congregation at Temple Israel in Hollywood, California:

"We Shall Overcome" was sung days later by over fifty thousand attendees at the funeral of Martin Luther King Jr.

Farmworkers in the United States later sang the song in Spanish during the strikes and grape boycotts of the late 1960s. The song was notably sung by the U.S. Senator for New York Robert F. Kennedy, when he led anti-Apartheid crowds in choruses from the rooftop of his car while touring South Africa in 1966. It was also the song which Abie Nathan chose to broadcast as the anthem of the Voice of Peace radio station on October 1, 1993, and as a result it found its way back to South Africa in the later years of the Anti-Apartheid Movement.

The Northern Ireland Civil Rights Association adopted "we shall overcome" as a slogan and used it in the title of its retrospective publication, We Shall Overcome – The History of the Struggle for Civil Rights in Northern Ireland 1968–1978. The film Bloody Sunday depicts march leader and Member of Parliament (MP) Ivan Cooper leading the song shortly before 1972's Bloody Sunday shootings. In 1997, the Christian men's ministry, Promise Keepers featured the song on its worship CD for that year: The Making of a Godly Man, featuring worship leader Donn Thomas and the Maranatha! Promise Band. Bruce Springsteen's re-interpretation of the song was included on the 1998 tribute album Where Have All the Flowers Gone: The Songs of Pete Seeger as well as on Springsteen's 2006 album We Shall Overcome: The Seeger Sessions.

Widespread adaptation
"We Shall Overcome" was adopted by various labor, nationalist, and political movements both during and after the Cold War. In his memoir about his years teaching English in Czechoslovakia after the Velvet Revolution, Mark Allen wrote:

The words "We shall overcome" are sung emphatically at the end of each verse in a song of Northern Ireland's civil rights movement, Free the People, which protested against the internment policy of the British Army.  The movement in Northern Ireland was keen to emulate the movement in the US and often sang "We shall overcome".

The melody was also used (crediting it to Tindley) in a symphony by American composer William Rowland. In 1999, National Public Radio included "We Shall Overcome" on the "NPR 100" list of most important American songs of the 20th century. As a reference to the line, in 2009, after the first inauguration of Barack Obama as the 44th President of the United States, a man holding the banner, "WE HAVE OVERCOME" was seen near the Capitol, a day after hundreds of people posed with the sign on Martin Luther King Jr. Day.

As the attempted serial killer "Lasermannen" shot several immigrants around Stockholm in 1992, Prime Minister Carl Bildt and Immigration Minister Birgit Friggebo attended a meeting in Rinkeby. As the audience became upset, Friggebo tried to calm them down by proposing that everyone sing "We Shall Overcome". This statement is widely regarded as one of the most embarrassing moments in Swedish politics. In 2008, the newspaper Svenska Dagbladet listed the Sveriges Television recording of the event as the best political clip available on YouTube.

On June 7, 2010, Roger Waters of Pink Floyd fame released a new version of the song as a protest against the Israeli blockade of Gaza.

On July 22, 2012, Bruce Springsteen performed the song during the memorial-concert in Oslo after the terrorist attacks in Norway on July 22, 2011.

In India, the renowned poet Girija Kumar Mathur composed its literal translation in Hindi "Hum Honge Kaamyab (हम होंगे कामयाब)" which became a popular patriotic/spiritual song during the 1970s and 80s, particularly in schools. This song also came to be used by the Blue Pilgrims for motivating the India national football team during international matches.

In Bengali-speaking India and Bangladesh, there are two versions, both of which are popular among school-children and political activists. "Amra Korbo Joy" (আমরা করবো জয়, a literal translation) was translated by the Bengali folk singer Hemanga Biswas and re-recorded by Bhupen Hazarika. Hazarika, who had heard the song during his days in the US, also translated the song to the Assamese language as "Ami hom xophol" (আমি হ'ম সফল). Another version, translated by Shibdas Bandyopadhyay, "Ek Din Shurjer Bhor" (এক দিন সূর্যের ভোর, literally translated as "One Day The Sun Will Rise") was recorded by the Calcutta Youth Choir and arranged by Ruma Guha Thakurta during the 1971 Bangladesh War of Independence and it became one of the largest selling Bengali records. It was a favorite of Bangladeshi Prime Minister Sheikh Mujibur Rahman and it was regularly sung at public events after Bangladesh gained its independence in the early 1970s.

In the Indian State of Kerala, the traditional Communist stronghold, the song became popular on college campuses during the late 1970s. It was the struggle song of the Students Federation of India SFI, the largest student organisation in the country. The song translated to the regional language Malayalam by N. P. Chandrasekharan, an activist for SFI. The translation followed the same tune of the original song, as "Nammal Vijayikkum". Later it was also published in Student, the monthly of SFI in Malayalam as well as in Sarvadesheeya Ganangal (Mythri Books, Thiruvananthapuram), a translation of international struggle songs.

"We Shall Overcome" was a prominent song in the 2010 Bollywood film My Name is Khan, which compared the struggle of Muslims in modern America with the struggles of African Americans in the past. The song was sung in both English and Hindi in the film, which starred Kajol and Shahrukh Khan.

In 2014, a recording of We Shall Overcome arranged by composer Nolan Williams Jr. and featuring mezzo-soprano Denyce Graves was among several works of art, including the poem A Brave and Startling Truth by Maya Angelou, were sent to space on the first test flight of the spacecraft Orion.

The Argentine writer and singer María Elena Walsh wrote a Spanish version called "Venceremos".

Celtic punk band Dropkick Murphys released their version of the song as a single and music video in 2022. Their version can also be found on the expanded edition of their 2021 album, Turn Up That Dial.

Copyright status
The copyright status of "We Shall Overcome" was disputed in the late 2010s. A copyright registration was made for the song in 1960, which is credited as an arrangement by Zilphia Horton, Guy Carawan, Frank Hamilton, and Pete Seeger, of a work entitled "I'll Overcome", with no known original author. Horton's heirs, Carawan, Hamilton, and Seeger share the artists' half of the rights, and The Richmond Organization (TRO), which includes Ludlow Music, Essex, Folkways Music, and Hollis Music, holds the publishers' rights, to 50% of the royalty earnings. Seeger explained that he registered the copyright under the advice of TRO, who showed concern that someone else could register it. "At that time we didn't know Lucille Simmons' name", Seeger said. Their royalties go to the "We Shall Overcome" Fund, administered by Highlander under the trusteeship of the "writers". Such funds are purportedly used to give small grants for cultural expression involving African Americans organizing in the U.S. South.

In April 2016, the We Shall Overcome Foundation (WSOF), led by music producer Isaias Gamboa, sued TRO and Ludlow, seeking to have the copyright status of the song clarified and the return of all royalties collected by the companies from its usage. The WSOF, which was working on a documentary about the song and its history, were denied permission to use the song by TRO-Ludlow. The filing argued that TRO-Ludlow's copyright claims were invalid because the registered copyright had not been renewed as required by United States copyright law at the time; because of this, the copyright of the 1948 People's Songs publication containing "We Will Overcome" had expired in 1976. Additionally, it was argued that the registered copyrights only covered specific arrangements of the tune and "obscure alternate verses", that the registered works "did not contain original works of authorship, except to the extent of the arrangements themselves", and that no record of a work entitled "I'll Overcome" existed in the database of the United States Copyright Office.

The suit acknowledged that Seeger himself had not claimed to be an author of the song, stating of the song in his autobiography, "No one is certain who changed 'will' to 'shall.' It could have been me with my Harvard education. But Septima Clarke, a Charleston schoolteacher (who was director of education at Highlander and after the civil rights movement was elected year after year to the Charleston, S.C. Board of Education) always preferred 'shall.' It sings better." He also reaffirmed that the decision to copyright the song was a defensive measure, with his publisher apparently warning him that "if you don't copyright this now, some Hollywood types will have a version out next year like 'Come on Baby, We shall overcome tonight. Furthermore, the liner notes of Seeger's compilation album If I Had a Hammer: Songs of Hope & Struggle contained a summary on the purported history of the song, stating that "We Shall Overcome" was "probably adapted from the 19th-century hymn, 'I'll Be All Right, and that "I'll Overcome Some Day" was a "possible source" and may have originally been adapted from "I'll Be All Right".

Gamboa has historically shown interest in investigating the origins of "We Shall Overcome"; in a book entitled We Shall Overcome: Sacred Song On The Devil's Tongue, he notably disputed the song's claimed origins and copyright registration with an alternate theory, suggesting that "We Shall Overcome" was actually derived from "If My Jesus Wills", a hymn by Louise Shropshire that had been composed in the 1930s and had its copyright registered in 1954. The WSOF lawsuit did not invoke this alternate history, focusing instead on the original belief that the song stemmed from "We Will Overcome". The lawyer backing Gamboa's suit, Mark C. Rifkin, was previously involved in a case that invalidated copyright claims over the song "Happy Birthday to You".

On September 8, 2017, Judge Denise Cote of the Southern District of New York issued an opinion that there were insufficient differences between the first verse of the "We Shall Overcome" lyrics registered by TRO-Ludlow, and the "We Will Overcome" lyrics from People's Songs (specifically, the aforementioned replacement of "will" with "shall", and changing "down in my heart" to "deep in my heart") for it to qualify as a distinct derivative work eligible for its own copyright.

On January 26, 2018, TRO-Ludlow agreed to a final settlement, under which it would no longer claim copyright over the melody or lyrics to "We Shall Overcome". In addition, TRO-Ludlow agreed that the melody and lyrics were thereafter dedicated to the public domain.

See also
 Civil rights movement in popular culture
 Timeline of the civil rights movement
 Christian child's prayer § Spirituals

Notes

References
 Dunaway, David, How Can I Keep from Singing: Pete Seeger, (orig. pub. 1981, reissued 1990). Da Capo, New York, .
 ___, "The We Shall Overcome Fund". Highlander Reports, newsletter of the Highlander Research and Education Center, August–November 2004, p. 3.
 We Shall Overcome, PBS Home Video 174, 1990, 58 minutes.

Further reading
 Sing for Freedom: The Story of the Civil Rights Movement Through Its Songs: Compiled and edited by Guy and Candie Carawan; foreword by Julian Bond (New South Books, 2007), comprising two classic collections of freedom songs:  We Shall Overcome (1963) and Freedom Is A Constant Struggle (1968), reprinted in a single edition. The book includes a major new introduction by Guy and Candie Carawan, words and music to the songs, important documentary photographs, and firsthand accounts by participants in the civil rights movement. Available from Highlander Center.
 We Shall Overcome! Songs of the Southern Freedom Movement: Julius Lester, editorial assistant. Ethel Raim, music editor: Additional musical transcriptions: Joseph Byrd [and] Guy Carawan. New York: Oak Publications, 1963.
 Freedom is a Constant Struggle, compiled and edited by Guy and Candie Carawan. Oak Publications, 1968.
 Alexander Tsesis, We Shall Overcome: A History of Civil Rights and the Law.  Yale University Press, 2008.
 We Shall Overcome: A Song that Changed the World, by Stuart Stotts, illustrated by Terrance Cummings, foreword by Pete Seeger.  New York: Clarion Books, 2010.
 Sing for Freedom, Folkways Records, produced by Guy and Candie Carawan, and the Highlander Center. Field recordings from 1960 to 1988, with the Freedom Singers, Birmingham Movement Choir, Georgia Sea Island Singers, Doc Reese, Phil Ochs, Pete Seeger, Len Chandler, and many others. Smithsonian-Folkways CD version 1990.
 We Shall Overcome: The Complete Carnegie Hall Concert, June 8, 1963, Historic Live recording June 8, 1963. 2-disc set, includes the full concert, starring Pete Seeger, with the Freedom Singers, Columbia # 45312, 1989. Re-released 1997 by Sony as a box CD set.
 Voices Of The Civil Rights Movement: Black American Freedom Songs 1960–1966. Box CD set, with the Freedom Singers, Fanny Lou Hammer, and Bernice Johnson Reagon. Smithsonian-Folkways CD ASIN: B000001DJT (1997).
 Durman, C 2015, 'We Shall Overcome: Essays on a Great American Song edited by Victor V. Bobetsky', Music Reference Services Quarterly, vol. 8, iss. 3, pp. 185–187
 Graham, D 2016, "Who Owns 'We Shall Overcome'?", The Atlantic, 14 April, accessed 28 April 2017,  Who Owns 'We Shall Overcome'?
 Clark, B. & Borchert, S 2015, "Pete Seeger, Musical Revolutionary", Monthly Review, vol. 66, no. 8, pp. 20–29

External links

 We Shall Overcome Lyrics download in PDF.

 
 Lyrics
 Authorized Profile of Guy Carawan with history of the song, "We Shall Overcome" from the Association of Cultural Equity
 Freedom in the Air: Albany Georgia. 1961–62. SNCC #101. Recorded by Guy Carawan, produced for the Student Non-Violent Coordinating Committee by Guy Carawan and Alan Lomax. "Freedom In the Air ... is a record of the 1961 protest in Albany, Georgia, when, two weeks before Christmas, 737 people brought the town nearly to a halt to force its integration. The record's never been reissued and that's a shame, as it's a moving document of a community through its protest songs, church services, and experiences in the thick of the civil rights struggle."—Nathan Salsburg, host, Root Hog or Die, East Village Radio, January 2007.
 Susanne's Folksong-Notizen, excerpts from various articles, liner notes, etc. about "We Shall Overcome". 
 Musical Transcription of "We Shall Overcome," based on a recording of Pete Seeger's version, sung with the SNCC Freedom Singers on the 1963 live Carnegie Hall recording, and the 1988 version by Pete Seeger sung at a reunion concert with Pete and the Freedom Singers on the anthology, Sing for Freedom, recorded in the field 1960–88 and edited and annotated by Guy and Candie Carawan, released in 1990 as Smithsonian-Folkways CD SF 40032.
 NPR news article including full streaming versions of Pete Seeger's classic 1963 live Carnegie Hall recording and Bruce Springsteen's tribute version.
 "Pete Seeger & the story of 'We Shall Overcome'" from 1968 interview on The Pop Chronicles.
 "Something About That Song Haunts You", essay on the history of "We Shall Overcome," Complicated Fun, June 9, 2006.
 "Howie Richmond Views Craft Of Song: Publishing Giant Celebrates 50 Years As TRO Founder", by Irv Lichtman, Billboard, 8, 28, 1999. Excerpt: "Key folk songs in the [TRO] catalog, as arranged by a number of folklorists, are 'We Shall Overcome,' 'Kisses Sweeter Than Wine' 'On Top Of Old Smokey,' 'So Long, It's Been Good To Know You,' 'Goodnight Irene,' 'If I Had A Hammer,' 'Tom Dooley,' and 'Rock Island Line.'"

1900 songs
American folk songs
American patriotic songs
Gospel songs
Bluegrass songs
American Christian hymns
Songs about freedom
Songs of the civil rights movement
Pete Seeger songs
Joan Baez songs
Songs against racism and xenophobia
Roger Waters songs
Mahalia Jackson songs
Peter, Paul and Mary songs
Articles containing video clips
Songs involved in royalties controversies
Slogans
American political catchphrases
1950s neologisms
Quotations from music
Protest songs